Coșereni is a commune located in Ialomița County, Muntenia, Romania, about  to the northeast of Bucharest. It is composed of a single village, Coșereni.

History 
On October 30, 1992, the singers Doina and Ion Aldea Teodorovici died following a road accident in Coșereni. A monument was erected where the accident took place.

Natives
 Nicolae Condeescu
 Marian Neacșu

Gallery

References

Communes in Ialomița County
Localities in Muntenia